The Hobie Getaway is an American catamaran sailboat, that was designed by Hobie Cat and first built in 2001.

Production
The boat has built by Hobie Cat in the United States since 2001, and remained in production in 2021.

Design

The Getaway is a small recreational catamaran, with the dual hulls built of rotomolded polyethylene. It has a fractional sloop rig, including a roller furling jib and a full-batten mainsail, dual transom-hung rudders and no keel or daggerboards. It displaces  and can carry  of occupants.

A mast-top float to prevent the boat turning turtle is included as standard equipment. Wing seats for hiking out and trapezing from are optional. A trapeze is also optional.

See also
List of sailing boat types

References

External links

Catamarans
Dinghies
2000s sailboat type designs
Sailing yachts
Sailboat type designs by Hobie Cat
Sailboat types built by Hobie Cat